Oligocentria delicata is a species of moth in the family Notodontidae (the prominents). It was first described by Harrison Gray Dyar Jr. in 1905 and it is found in North America.

The MONA or Hodges number for Oligocentria delicata is 8020.

References

Further reading

 
 
 
 
 
 
 
 
 

Notodontidae
Articles created by Qbugbot
Moths described in 1905